Cimochowizna  is a village in the administrative district of Gmina Suwałki, within Suwałki County, Podlaskie Voivodeship, in north-eastern Poland.

In Cimochowizna is the official residency of the Szpilman Award.

References

Cimochowizna